General Nuisance (1941) is the ninth short subject starring Buster Keaton made for Columbia Pictures.

Plot
Aristocratic millionaire Peter Hedley Lamar Jr. (Buster Keaton) is entranced by army nurse Dorothy Appleby but her cohort Elsie Ames lets Lamar know that Dorothy is only interested in men in uniform.  Lamar enlists to be near Dorothy, but Elsie tries to woo Lamar by singing a silly song to him (and Buster sings and dances!).  Still interested in Dorothy, Lamar wounds himself to get under the care of Dorothy.  Elsie is still after him, but Dorothy finally comes around after Lamar saves her life.

Production
This short is a reworking of Buster's 1930 feature Doughboys.

Cast
 Buster Keaton as Peter Hedley Lamar Jr.
 Dorothy Appleby as army nurse Dorothy
 Elsie Ames as army nurse
 Monty Collins as Sgt. Michael Collins
 Nick Arno as recruiting doctor
 Bud Jamison as a General
 Lynton Brendt as a Captain
 Harry Semels as a Latin American delegate

See also
 Buster Keaton filmography

External links

 General Nuisance at the International Buster Keaton Society

References

1941 films
1941 comedy films
Columbia Pictures short films
American black-and-white films
Films directed by Jules White
American comedy short films
1940s English-language films
1940s American films